José Nepomuceno y Zialcita (May 15, 1893 – December 1, 1959) was one of the pioneering directors and producers of Philippine cinema. He is also known as the "founder of Philippine movies", and he had his own production company Jose Nepomuceno Productions. He produced the first Filipino silent film entitled Dalagang Bukid in 1919. The film starred Atang de la Rama, a future National Artist of the Philippines.
He also directed Un (El) Capullo Marchito ("A Wilted Rosebud") in 1920. It starred Luisa Acuña, who then became a famous leading lady in Filipino silent films.

Filmography

Director
Dalagang Bukid ("Country Maiden") (1919)
La Venganza de Don Silvestre (1920)
Un Capullo Marchito (1920)
Ang Tatlong Hambog ("The Three Humbugs") (1926)
Ang Manananggal (1927)
Hot Kisses (1927)
The Filipino Woman (1927)
Ang Lumang Simbahan ("The Old Church") (1928)
The Pearl of the Markets (1929)
Sa Landas ng Pag-ibig ("The Path of Love") (1929)
Child Out of Wedlock (1930)
Noli Me Tángere (1930)
The Young Nun (1931)
The Secret Pagan God (1931)
Moro Pirates (1931)
At Heaven's Gate (1932)
Stray Flowers (1932)
Punyal na Guinto ("Golden Dagger") (1933)

Producer
Ang Tatlong Hambog ("The Three Humbugs") (1926)
La mujer Filipina (1927)

Writer
Dahil sa Isang Bulaklak (1967)

References

External links

1893 births
1959 deaths
Filipino film directors
Filipino film editors
Filipino screenwriters
People from Manila
Filipino film studio executives